Tooperang is a small town and locality on Fleurieu Peninsula in the Alexandrina Council, South Australia. It includes the Cox Scrub Conservation Reserve.

The Tooperang Hall on Bull Creek Road hosts the Astronomical Society of South Australia (ASSA) on a regular basis where members take advantage of the geography of the region which blocks light spill from metropolitan Adelaide to create ideal conditions for astronomy. The locality of Tooperang extends west from the town along Cleland Gully Road.

Tooperang is located within the federal division of Mayo, the state electoral district of Finniss and the local government area of the Alexandrina Council.

References

Towns in South Australia